Kekec's Tricks  is a 1968 Yugoslav/Slovenian adventure film directed by Jože Gale. The film is based on the Kekec mountain narratives by Josip Vandot, originally published in Slovenian youth magazine Zvonček. It was produced at Viba film and distributed originally at Vesna film and currently at Viba film.

This is the last of three in the Jože Gale film series about Kekec and has two previous parts: Kekec from 1951 and Good Luck, Kekec (Srečno, Kekec!) from 1963.

Plot 
In the third and the last part of the film trilogy about Kekec (Zlatko Krasnič), evil wild poacher Bedanec (Polde Bibič) appears again. Kekec and his friends are there to chase and hunt Bedanec again and sent him far away. Bedanec catches Brincelj (Milorad Radovič) and Rožle (Boris Ivanovski). Very brave Kekec saves both of them with the help of his wisdom and tricks Bedanec, who catches in his own trap that he set.

Kekec saves Bedanec out of the trap because he asks him nicely, but he doesn't learn anything out of this. A wise man Vitranc (Jože Zupan) wants to bring a peace in these places.

Cast

Music 
The whole music including theme was composed by Bojan Adamič, a Slovenian composer. Lyrics for theme song called "Kekčeva pesem" were written by Kajetan Kovič and performed by Slovenian Philharmonic Orchestra.

External links 

 

1968 films
Slovene-language films
1968 adventure films
Films set in the Alps
Yugoslav adventure films
Slovenian adventure films